Siódmak is a Polish surname. Notable people include:

Curt Siodmak, novelist and screenwriter, brother of Robert
Robert Siodmak (1900–1973), German-born American film director

Places
Siódmak, Elbląg County, a village in northern Poland
Siódmak, Szczytno County, another village in northern Poland

Polish-language surnames